809 Naval Air Squadron (809 NAS) is a squadron of the Fleet Air Arm of the United Kingdom. It was first formed in 1941 and flew in the Soviet Union, the Mediterranean and the Far East during the Second World War. After active service during the Suez Crisis, 809 was disbanded in 1959. Reformed in 1963 to fly Blackburn Buccaneers, the squadron was disbanded briefly in 1965-66, and then again in 1978.

In September 2013, it was announced that the first Royal Navy squadron equipped with the Lockheed Martin F-35B Lightning would be named 809 Naval Air Squadron with the nickname "Immortals". In 2016 it had been planned that the squadron would re-commission in April 2023 as the UK's second operational F-35B squadron after No. 617 Squadron RAF. However, as of 2021 it was no longer clear that this objective would be met and a specific date for 809 squadron to re-commission had yet to be confirmed. In September 2022, it was reported that 809 Squadron would formally re-commission in 2023 but that it would not be considered "deployable" for a further two years.

History

Second World War

At first involved in operations against Petsamo and Bodø, and then the convoys to North Russia, Victorious and her air group fought in the Mediterranean from July 1942, including participating in Operation Pedestal.

After being trained in army co-operation duties at Sawbridge, 809 re-embarked in Victorious in October 1942 and conducted tactical reconnaissance for the North African landings of Operation Torch.  After being re-equipped with the Supermarine Seafire IIc, the squadron provided cover for Operation Avalanche, the allied landings at Salerno.

The squadron flew Seafires off  during 1944, including landing detachments in North Africa and Italy between May and July. Stalker and 809 formed part of Task Force 88 covering the Operation Dragoon landings in Southern France in August 1944.

The final days of World War II saw 809 providing fighter cover for Operation Dracula, the re-occupation of Rangoon, then in June operations in British Malaya and Sumatra. The ship subsequently gave cover for Operation Zipper, the re-occupation of Malaya after V-J Day.

Post-War
The unit was then briefly seconded to the Royal Air Force (RAF) at Coltishall before a posting to RAF Hal Far on Malta where it transitioned from the Sea Hornet to the De Havilland Sea Venom jet aircraft in 1954. Between May 1954 and August 1959 the squadron operated Sea Venoms, in the all-weather fighter role, including active service during the Suez Crisis in 1956 while embarked aboard .

Cold War

809 NAS re-formed on 15 January 1963 as the second frontline Blackburn Buccaneer S.1 squadron (after 801 NAS), using aircraft and crews from the recently disbanded 700Z NAS (the Buccaneer S.1 trials and training unit) under the command of 700Z's commanding officer, Commander 'Spiv' Leahy. The squadron was tasked with continuing 700Z's duties and became the Buccaneer Headquarters squadron. The aircraft at the time were painted in 'anti-flash' white with toned-down markings because of the Buccaneer's nuclear role, with the squadron badge of a phoenix on the sides of the jet intakes. By 1965 the Buccaneer force had switched to the standard Fleet Air Arm finish of dark sea grey upper surfaces and white undersides, and the squadron badge was moved to the tail. In April 1965, 809 NAS disbanded again and its role was taken over by 736 NAS at RNAS Lossiemouth.

809 re-formed in 1966 under the command of Lt Cdr Lyn Middleton and was now equipped with the Rolls-Royce Spey-powered Buccaneer S.2.

In 1972, Ark Royal and 809 RNAS were despatched "with haste" from the North Atlantic to 'show presence' over British Honduras, now Belize, in the face of neighbouring Guatemalan threats to invade Belize. Steaming hard at 27 knots, and when eventually off Bermuda, two Buccaneers were launched along with two more buddy tanker versions to make one of the longest journeys of its type. In a six-hour round trip the two Buccaneers showed presence over Belize and made the Guatemalan government, with its P-51D Mustangs and limited ground forces, hesitate long enough for other events to intervene. Later the squadron transferred its home base from RNAS Lossiemouth (which was being transferred to RAF control, and later became the home base of the last RAF Buccaneer squadrons) to RAF Honington. 809 NAS continued to alternate between RAF Honington and Ark Royal until November 1978, when after flying off the carrier for the last time in the Mediterranean, the squadron flew direct to RAF St Athan, where the aircraft were formally handed over to the RAF. 809 Squadron was officially disbanded at HMS Daedalus on the 13 December 1978, and the aircraft were used to form the RAF's No. 216 Squadron in 1979.

Falklands War

At the outbreak of war, 899 sent three aircraft to join 801 aboard Invincible and seven aircraft to join 800 aboard Hermes. These aircraft sailed with the Falklands Task Force, whilst the remains of 899 NAS set about bringing the remaining Sea Harriers in store or on other duties into operational use.

It was planned to form a third front line squadron with ten Sea Harriers, but only eight could be brought together initially. These aircraft were painted a lighter low visibility grey than the rest of the Sea Harrier fleet, and were then issued to the reformed 809 NAS, under Lieutenant Commander Tim Gedge, which were transported south on the ill-fated Atlantic Conveyor. After arriving with the Task force, the aircraft and pilots were split between the two carriers and were absorbed by their squadrons, as 899's aircraft had been earlier. After the ceasefire, 809 re-formed as a single unit and returned to the UK aboard Hermes, where after a very short break they embarked aboard the newly completed  and returned to the South Atlantic to provide air defence cover until Port Stanley Airport could be repaired. The squadron remained on station until relieved by RAF Phantom FGR2s of No. 29 Squadron based at Stanley. Illustrious returned home in December, and 809 NAS finally disbanded on 17 December 1982.

Future

In September 2013, it was announced that 809 NAS was to be reformed to become the first Fleet Air Arm squadron to be equipped with the Lockheed Martin F-35B Lightning. The squadron will operate alongside No. 617 Squadron of the Royal Air Force as part of the Lightning Force, and will be stationed at RAF Marham, Norfolk, when not deployed aboard one of the s. Both squadrons will consist of both Royal Navy and Royal Air Force personnel. In September 2022, James Heappey, the Minister of State for the Armed Forces, stated that 809 NAS was "due to stand up in quarter two of 2023", with full operating capability expected in 2025.

Aircraft flown
List of aircraft operated by 809 NAS:

 Fairey Fulmar Mk.II (Jan 1941–Mar 1943)
 Supermarine Spitfire Mk.Va (Mar 1943–June 1943)
 Supermarine Seafire Mk.Ib (Apr 1943–Aug 1943)
 Supermarine Seafire L.IIc (Mar 1943–Oct 1944)
 Supermarine Seafire L.III (July 1944–Dec 1945)
 Supermarine Seafire F.XV (Nov 1945–Dec 1945)
 Supermarine Seafire F.XVII (Nov 1945–Jan 1946)
 De Havilland Sea Hornet NF.21 (Jan 1949–May 1954)
 De Havilland Sea Venom FAW.21 (May 1954–Aug 1959)
 Blackburn Buccaneer S.1 (Jan 1963–Mar 1965)
 Blackburn Buccaneer S.2 (Jan 1966–Dec 1978)
 Hawker Siddeley Sea Harrier FRS.1 (Apr 1982–Dec 1982)
 Lockheed Martin F-35B Lightning (Planned for 2023)

Notes

References 

800 series Fleet Air Arm squadrons
Air squadrons of the Royal Navy in World War II
Military units and formations disestablished in 1982